The Arab Revolt or the Great Arab Revolt was a military uprising of Arab forces against the Ottoman Empire in the Middle Eastern theatre of World War I. On the basis of the McMahon–Hussein Correspondence, an agreement between the British government and Hussein bin Ali, Sharif of Mecca, the revolt was officially initiated at Mecca on June 10, 1916. The aim of the revolt was to create a single unified and independent Arab state stretching from Aleppo in Syria to Aden in Yemen, which the British had promised to recognize.

The Sharifian Army led by Hussein and the Hashemites, with military backing from the British Egyptian Expeditionary Force, successfully fought and expelled the Ottoman military presence from much of the Hejaz and Transjordan. The rebellion eventually took Damascus and set up the Arab Kingdom of Syria, a short-lived monarchy led by Faisal, a son of Hussein.

Following the Sykes–Picot Agreement, the Middle East was later partitioned by the British and French into mandate territories rather than a unified Arab state, and the British reneged on their promise to support a unified independent Arab state.

Background 

The rise of nationalism in the Ottoman Empire dates from at least 1821. Arab nationalism has its roots in the Mashriq (the Arab lands east of Egypt), particularly in countries of the Levant. The political orientation of Arab nationalists before World War I was generally moderate. Their demands were of a reformist nature and generally limited to autonomy, a greater use of Arabic in education and changes in peacetime conscription in the Ottoman Empire to allow Arab conscripts local service in the Ottoman army.

The Young Turk Revolution began on 3 July 1908 and quickly spread throughout the empire. As a result, Sultan Abdul Hamid II was forced to announce the restoration of the 1876 constitution and the reconvening of the Ottoman parliament. The period is known as the Second Constitutional Era. In the 1908 elections, the Young Turks' Committee of Union and Progress (CUP) managed to gain the upper hand against the Liberal Union, led by Sultanzade Sabahaddin. The new parliament had 142 Turks, 60 Arabs, 25 Albanians, 23 Greeks, 12 Armenians (including four Dashnaks and two Hunchaks), five Jews, four Bulgarians, three Serbs and one Vlach.

The CUP now gave more emphasis to centralisation and a modernisation. It preached a message that was a mixture of pan-Islamism, Ottomanism, and pan-Turkism, which was adjusted as the conditions warranted. At heart, the CUP were Turkish nationalists who wanted to see the Turks as the dominant group within the Ottoman Empire, which antagonised Arab leaders and prompted them to think in similarly nationalistic terms. Arab members of the parliament supported the countercoup of 1909, which aimed to dismantle the constitutional system and to restore the absolute monarchy of Sultan Abdul Hamid II. The dethroned sultan attempted to restore the Ottoman Caliphate by putting an end to the secular policies of the Young Turks, but he was, in turn, driven away to exile in Selanik by the 31 March Incident in which the Young Turks defeated the countercoup, and he was eventually replaced by his brother Mehmed V.

In 1913, intellectuals and politicians from the Mashriq met in Paris at the First Arab Congress. They produced a set of demands for greater autonomy and equality within the Ottoman Empire, including for elementary and secondary education in Arab lands to be delivered in Arabic, for peacetime Arab conscripts to the Ottoman army to serve near their home region and for at least three Arab ministers in the Ottoman cabinet.

Forces 
It is estimated that the Arab forces involved in the revolt numbered around 5000 soldiers. This number however probably applies to the Arab regulars who fought during the Sinai and Palestine campaign with Edmund Allenby's Egyptian Expeditionary Force, and not the irregular forces under the direction of T. E. Lawrence and Faisal. On a few occasions, particularly during the final campaign into Syria, this number would grow significantly. Many Arabs joined the Revolt sporadically, often as a campaign was in progress or only when the fighting entered their home region. During the Battle of Aqaba, for instance, while the initial Arab force numbered only a few hundred, over a thousand more from local tribes joined them for the final assault on Aqaba. Estimates of Faisal's effective forces vary, but through most of 1918 at least, they may have numbered as high as 30,000 men.

The Hashemite Army comprised two distinctive forces: tribal irregulars who waged a guerrilla war against the Ottoman Empire and the Sharifian Army, which was recruited from Ottoman Arab POWs and fought in conventional battles. Hashemite forces were initially poorly equipped, but later were to receive significant supplies of weapons, most notably rifles and machine guns from Britain and France.

In the early days of the revolt, Faisal's forces were largely made up of Bedouins and other nomadic desert tribes, who were only loosely allied, loyal more to their respective tribes than the overall cause. The Bedouin would not fight unless paid in advance with gold coin, and by the end of 1916, the French had spent 1.25 million gold francs in subsidizing the revolt. By September 1918, the British were spending £220,000/month to subsidize the revolt.

Faisal had hoped that he could convince Arab troops serving in the Ottoman Army to mutiny and join his cause, but the Ottoman government sent most of its Arab troops to the Western front-lines of the war, and thus only a handful of deserters actually joined the Arab forces until later in the campaign.

Ottoman troops in the Hejaz numbered 20,000 men by 1917. At the outbreak of the revolt in June 1916, the VII Corps of the Fourth Army was stationed in the Hejaz to be joined by the 58th Infantry Division commanded by Lieutenant-Colonel Ali Necib Pasha, the 1st Kuvvie- Mürettebe (Provisional Force) led by General Mehmed Cemal Pasha, which had the responsibility of safeguarding the Hejaz railway and the Hejaz Expeditionary Force, which was under the command of General Fakhri Pasha. In face of increasing attacks on the Hejaz railway, the 2nd Kuvve i Mürettebe was created by 1917. The Ottoman force included a number of Arab units who stayed loyal to the Sultan-Caliph and fought well against the Allies.

The Ottoman troops enjoyed an advantage over the Hashemite troops at first in that they were well supplied with modern German weapons. In addition, the Ottoman forces had the support of both the Ottoman Aviation Squadrons, air squadrons from Germany and the Ottoman Gendarmerie or zaptı. Moreover, the Ottomans relied upon the support of Emir Saud bin Abdulaziz Al Rashid of the Emirate of Jabal Shammar, whose tribesmen dominated what is now northern Saudi Arabia and tied down both the Hashemites and Saʻudi forces with the threat of their raiding attacks.

The great weakness of the Ottoman forces was they were at the end of a long and tenuous supply line in the form of the Hejaz railway, and because of their logistical weaknesses, were often forced to fight on the defensive. Ottoman offensives against the Hashemite forces more often faltered due to supply problems than to the actions of the enemy.

The main contribution of the Arab Revolt to the war was to pin down tens of thousands of Ottoman troops who otherwise might have been used to attack the Suez Canal other other Allied terrorties, allowing the British to undertake offensive operations with a lower risk of counter-attack. This was indeed the British justification for supporting the revolt, a textbook example of asymmetric warfare that has been studied time and again by military leaders and historians alike.

History

Revolt 

The Ottoman Empire took part in the Middle Eastern theatre of World War I, under the terms of the Ottoman–German Alliance.  Many Arab nationalist figures in Damascus and Beirut were arrested, then tortured. The flag of the resistance was designed by Sir Mark Sykes, in an effort to create a feeling of "Arab-ness" in order to fuel the revolt.

Prelude (November 1914 – October 1916) 

When Herbert Kitchener was Consul-General in Egypt, contacts between Abdullah and Kitchener had eventually culminated in a telegram of 1 November 1914 from Kitchener (recently appointed as Secretary of War) to Hussein wherein Great Britain would, in exchange for support from the Arabs of Hejaz, "guarantee the independence, rights and privileges of the Sharifate against all foreign external aggression, in particular that of the Ottomans" The Sharif indicated that he could not break with the Ottomans immediately, and it did not happen till the following year. From July 14, 1915, to March 10, 1916, a total of ten letters, five from each side, were exchanged between Sir Henry McMahon and Sherif Hussein. Hussein's letter of 18 February 1916 appealed to McMahon for £50,000 in gold plus weapons, ammunition, and food. Faisal claimed that he was awaiting the arrival of 'not less than 100,000 people' for the planned revolt. McMahon's reply of 10 March 1916 confirmed British agreement to the requests and concluded the correspondence. Hussein, who until then had officially been on the Ottoman side, was now convinced that his assistance to the Triple Entente would be rewarded by an Arab empire encompassing the entire span between Egypt and Qajar Iran, with the exception of imperial possessions and interests in Kuwait, Aden, and the Syrian coast. He decided to join the Allied camp immediately, because of rumours that he would soon be deposed as Sharif of Mecca by the Ottoman government in favor of Sharif Ali Haidar, leader of the rival Zaʻid family. The much-publicized executions of the Arab nationalist leaders in Damascus led Hussein to fear for his life if he were deposed in favour of Ali Haidar.

Hussein had about 50,000 men under arms, but fewer than 10,000 had rifles. On June 5, 1916, two of Hussein's sons, the emirs ʻAli and Faisal, began the revolt by attacking the Ottoman garrison in Medina, but were defeated by an aggressive Turkish defence led by Fakhri Pasha. The revolt proper began on June 10, 1916, when Hussein ordered his supporters to attack the Ottoman garrison in Mecca. In the Battle of Mecca, there ensued over a month of bloody street fighting between the out-numbered, but far better armed Ottoman troops and Hussein's tribesmen. Hashemite forces in Mecca were joined by Egyptian troops sent by the British, who provided much needed artillery support, and finally took Mecca on July 9, 1916.

Indiscriminate Ottoman artillery fire, which did much damage to Mecca, turned out to be a potent propaganda weapon for the Hashemites, who portrayed the Ottomans as desecrating Islam's most holy city.  Also on June 10, another of Hussein's sons, the Emir Abdullah, attacked Ta'if, which after an initial repulse settled down into a siege. With the Egyptian artillery support, Abdullah took Ta'if on September 22, 1916.

French and British naval forces had cleared the Red Sea of Ottoman gunboats early in the war.  The port of Jeddah was attacked by 3500 Arabs on 10 June 1916 with the assistance of bombardment by British warships and seaplanes. The seaplane carrier  provided crucial air support to the Hashemite forces. The Ottoman garrison surrendered on 16 June. By the end of September 1916, the Sharifian Army had taken the coastal cities of Rabigh, Yanbu, al Qunfudhah, and 6,000 Ottoman prisoners with the assistance of the Royal Navy.

The capture of the Red Sea ports allowed the British to send over a force of 700 Ottoman Arab POWs (who primarily came from what is now Iraq) who had decided to join the revolt led by Nuri al-Saʻid and a number of Muslim troops from French North Africa. Fifteen thousand well-armed Ottoman troops remained in the Hejaz. However, a direct attack on Medina in October resulted in a bloody repulse of the Arab forces.

Arrival of T. E. Lawrence (October 1916 – January 1917) 

In June 1916, the British sent out a number of officials to assist the revolt in the Hejaz, most notably Colonel Cyril Wilson, Colonel Pierce C. Joyce, and Lt-Colonel Stewart Francis Newcombe. Herbert Garland was also involved. In addition, a French military mission commanded by Colonel Édouard Brémond was sent out. The French enjoyed an advantage over the British in that they included a number of Muslim officers such as Captain Muhammand Ould Ali Raho, Claude Prost, and Laurent Depui (the latter two converted to Islam during their time in Arabia). Captain Rosario Pisani of the French Army, though not a Muslim, also played a notable role in the revolt as an engineering and artillery officer with the Arab Northern Army.

The British government in Egypt sent a young officer, Captain T. E. Lawrence, to work with the Hashemite forces in the Hejaz in October 1916. The British historian David Murphy wrote that though Lawrence was just one out of many British and French officers serving in Arabia, historians often write as though it was Lawrence alone who represented the Allied cause in Arabia.

David Hogarth credited Gertrude Bell for much of the success of the Arab Revolt. She had travelled extensively in the Middle East since 1888, after graduating from Oxford with a First in Modern History. Bell had met Sheikh Harb of the Howeitat in January 1914 and thus was able to provide a "mass of information" which was crucial to the success of Lawrence's occupation of Aqaba covering the "tribal elements ranging between the Hejaz Railway and the Nefud, particularly about the Howeitat group." It was this information, Hogarth emphasized, which "Lawrence, relying on her reports, made signal use of in the Arab campaigns of 1917 and 1918."

Lawrence obtained assistance from the Royal Navy to turn back an Ottoman attack on Yenbu in December 1916.  Lawrence's major contribution to the revolt was convincing the Arab leaders (Faisal and Abdullah) to co-ordinate their actions in support of British strategy. Lawrence developed a close relationship with Faisal, whose Arab Northern Army was to become the main beneficiary of British aid. By contrast, Lawrence's relations with Abdullah were not good, so Abdullah's Arab Eastern Army received considerably less in way of British aid. Lawrence persuaded the Arabs not to drive the Ottomans out of Medina; instead, the Arabs attacked the Hejaz railway on many occasions.  This tied up more Ottoman troops, who were forced to protect the railway and repair the constant damage.

On December 1, 1916, Fakhri Pasha began an offensive with three brigades out of Medina with the aim of taking the port of Yanbu. At first, Fakhri's troops defeated the Hashemite forces in several engagements, and seemed set to take Yanbu. It was fire and air support from the five ships of the Royal Navy Red Sea Patrol that defeated the Ottoman attempts to take Yanbu with heavy losses on December 11–12, 1916. Fakhri then turned his forces south to take Rabegh, but owing to the guerrilla attacks on his flanks and supply lines, air attacks from the newly established Royal Flying Corps base at Yanbu, and the over-extension of his supply lines, he was forced to turn back on January 18, 1917, to Medina.

The coastal city of Wejh was to be the base for attacks on the Hejaz railway.  On 3 January 1917, Faisal began an advance northward along the Red Sea coast with 5,100 camel riders, 5,300 men on foot, four Krupp mountain guns, ten machine guns, and 380 baggage camels.  The Royal Navy resupplied Faisal from the sea during his march on Wejh.  While the 800-man Ottoman garrison prepared for an attack from the south, a landing party of 400 Arabs and 200 Royal Navy bluejackets attacked Wejh from the north on 23 January 1917.  Wejh surrendered within 36 hours, and the Ottomans abandoned their advance toward Mecca in favor of a defensive position in Medina with small detachments scattered along the Hejaz railway.  The Arab force had increased to about 70,000 men armed with 28,000 rifles and deployed in three main groups.  Ali's force threatened Medina, Abdullah operated from Wadi Ais harassing Ottoman communications and capturing their supplies, and Faisal based his force at Wejh.  Camel-mounted Arab raiding parties had an effective radius of 1,000 miles (1,600 km) carrying their own food and taking water from a system of wells approximately 100 miles (160 km) apart. In late 1916, the Allies started the formation of the Regular Arab Army (also known as the Sharifian Army) raised from Ottoman Arab POWs. The soldiers of the Regular Army wore British-style uniforms with the keffiyahs and, unlike the tribal guerrillas, fought full-time and in conventional battles. Some of the more notable former Ottoman officers to fight in the Revolt were Nuri as-Said, Jafar al-Askari and 'Aziz 'Ali al-Misri.

Northward expeditions (January 1917 – November 1917) 

The year 1917 began well for the Hashemites when the Emir Abdullah and his Arab Eastern Army ambushed an Ottoman convoy led by Ashraf Bey in the desert, and captured £20,000 worth of gold coins that were intended to bribe the Bedouin into loyalty to the Sultan. Starting in early 1917, the Hashemite guerrillas began attacking the Hejaz railway. At first, guerrilla forces commanded by officers from the Regular Army such as al-Misri, and by British officers such as Newcombe, Lieutenant Hornby and Major Herbert Garland focused their efforts on blowing up unguarded sections of the Hejaz railway. Garland was the inventor of the so-called "Garland mine", which was used with much destructive force on the Hejaz railway. In February 1917, Garland succeeded for the first time in destroying a moving locomotive with a mine of his own design. Around Medina, Captain Muhammad Ould Ali Raho of the French Military Mission carried out his first railway demolition attack in February 1917. Captain Raho was to emerge as one of the leading destroyers of the Hejaz railway. In March 1917, Lawrence led his first attack on the Hejaz railway. Typical of such attacks were the one commanded out by Newcombe and Joyce who on the night of July 6/7, 1917 when they had planted over 500 charges on the Hejaz railway, which all went off at about 2 am. In a raid in August 1917, Captain Raho led a force of Bedouin in destroying 5 kilometers of the Hejaz railway and four bridges.

In March 1917, an Ottoman force joined by tribesmen from Jabal Shammar led by Ibn Rashid carried out a sweep of the Hejaz that did much damage to the Hashemite forces. However, the Ottoman failure to take Yanbu in December 1916 led to the increased strengthening of the Hashemite forces, and led to the Ottoman forces to assume the defensive. Lawrence was later to claim that the failure of the offensive against Yanbu was the turning point that ensured the ultimate defeat of the Ottomans in the Hejaz.

In 1917, Lawrence arranged a joint action with the Arab irregulars and forces under Auda Abu Tayi (until then in the employ of the Ottomans) against the port city of Aqaba. This is now known as the Battle of Aqaba. Aqaba was the only remaining Ottoman port on the Red Sea and threatened the right flank of Britain's Egyptian Expeditionary Force defending Egypt and preparing to advance into Sanjak Maan of the Syria Vilayet.  Capture of Aqaba would aid transfer of British supplies to the Arab revolt.  Lawrence and Auda left Wedj on 9 May 1917 with a party of 40 men to recruit a mobile force from the Howeitat, a tribe located in the area. On 6 July, after an overland attack, Aqaba fell to those Arab forces with only a handful of casualties.  Lawrence then rode 150 miles to Suez to arrange Royal Navy delivery of food and supplies for the 2,500 Arabs and 700 Ottoman prisoners in Aqaba; soon the city was co-occupied by a large Anglo-French flotilla (including warships and sea planes), which helped the Arabs secure their hold on Aqaba. Even as the Hashemite armies advanced, they still encountered sometimes fierce opposition from local residents. In July 1917, residents of the town of Karak fought against the Hashemite forces and turned them back. Later in the year British intelligence reports suggested that most of the tribes in the region east of the Jordan River were "firmly in the Ottoman camp." The tribes feared repressions and losing the money they had received from the Ottomans for their loyalty. Later in the year, the Hashemite warriors made a series of small raids on Ottoman positions in support of British General Allenby's winter attack on the Gaza–Bersheeba defensive line, which led to the Battle of Beersheba. Typical of such raids was one led by Lawrence in September 1917 that saw Lawrence destroy a Turkish rail convoy by blowing up the bridge it was crossing at Mudawwara and then ambushing the Turkish repair party. In November 1917, as aid to Allenby's offensive, Lawrence launched a deep-raiding party into the Yarmouk River valley, which failed to destroy the railway bridge at Tel ash-Shehab, but which succeeded in ambushing and destroying the train of General Mehmed Cemal Pasha, the commander of the Ottoman VII Corps. Allenby's victories led directly to the British capture of Jerusalem just before Christmas 1917.

Increased Allied assistance and the end of fighting (November 1917– October 1918) 

By the time of Aqaba's capture, many other officers joined Faisal's campaign. A large number of British officers and advisors, led by Lt. Col.s Stewart F. Newcombe and Cyril E. Wilson, arrived to provide the Arabs rifles, explosives, mortars, and machine guns. Artillery was only sporadically supplied due to a general shortage, though Faisal would have several batteries of mountain guns under French Captain Pisani and his Algerians for the Megiddo Campaign.  Egyptian and Indian troops also served with the Revolt, primarily as machine gunners and specialist troops, a number of armoured cars were allocated for use.  The Royal Flying Corps often supported the Arab operations, and the Imperial Camel Corps served with the Arabs for a time.  The French military mission of 1,100 officers under Brémond established good relations with Hussein and especially with his sons, the Emirs Ali and Abdullah, and for this reason, most of the French effort went into assisting the Arab Southern Army commanded by the Emir Ali that was laying siege to Medina and the Eastern Army commanded by Abdullah that had the responsibility of protecting Ali's eastern flank from Ibn Rashid. Medina was never taken by the Hashemite forces, and the Ottoman commander, Fakhri Pasha, only surrendered Medina when ordered to by the Turkish government on January 9, 1919. The total number of Ottoman troops bottled up in Medina by the time of the surrender were 456 officers and 9364 soldiers.

Under the direction of Lawrence, Wilson, and other officers, the Arabs launched a highly successful campaign against the Hejaz railway, capturing military supplies, destroying trains and tracks, and tying down thousands of Ottoman troops. Though the attacks were mixed in success, they achieved their primary goal of tying down Ottoman troops and cutting off Medina. In January 1918, in one of the largest set-piece battles of the Revolt, Arab forces (including Lawrence) defeated a large Ottoman force at the Battle of Tafilah, inflicting over 1,000 Ottoman casualties for the loss of a mere forty men.

In March 1918 the Arab Northern Army consisted of
Arab Regular Army commanded by Ja'far Pasha el Askeri
brigade of infantry
one battalion Camel Corps
one battalion mule-mounted infantry
about eight guns
British Section commanded by Lieutenant Colonel P. C. Joyce
Hejaz Armoured Car Battery of Rolls-Royce light armoured cars with machine guns and two 10-pdr guns on Talbot lorries
one Flight of aircraft
one Company Egyptian Camel Corps
Egyptian Camel Transport Corps
Egyptian Labour Corps
Wireless Station at 'Aqaba
French Detachment commanded by Captain Pisani
two mountain guns
four machine guns and 10 automatic rifles

In April 1918, Jafar al-Askari and Nuri as-Said led the Arab Regular Army in a frontal attack on the well-defended Ottoman railway station at Ma'an, which after some initial successes was fought off with heavy losses to both sides. However, the Sharifian Army succeeded in cutting off and thus neutralizing the Ottoman position at Ma'an, who held out until late September 1918. The British refused several requests from al-Askari to use mustard gas on the Ottoman garrison at Ma'an.

In the spring of 1918, Operation Hedgehog, a concerted attempt to sever and destroy the Hejaz railway, was launched. In May 1918, Hedgehog led to the destruction of 25 bridges of the Hejaz railway. On 11 May Arab regulars captured Jerdun and 140 prisoners. Five weeks later, on 24 July Nos. 5 and 7 Companies of the Imperial Camel Corps Brigade commanded by Major R. V. Buxton, marched from the Suez Canal to arrive at Aqaba on 30 July, to attack the Mudawwara Station. A particularly notable attack of Hedgehog was the storming on August 8, 1918, by the Imperial Camel Corps, closely supported by the Royal Air Force, of the well-defended Hejaz railway station at Mudawwara. They captured 120 prisoners and two guns, suffering 17 casualties in the operation. Buxton's two companies of Imperial Camel Corps Brigade continued on towards Amman, where they hoped to destroy the main bridge. For the final Allied offensive intended to knock the Ottoman Empire out of the war, Allenby asked that Emir Faisal and his Arab Northern Army launch a series of attacks on the main Turkish forces from the east, which was intended to both tie down Ottoman troops and force Turkish commanders to worry about their security of their flanks in the Levant. Supporting the Emir Faisal's army of about 450 men from the Arab Regular Army were tribal contingents from the Rwalla, Bani Sakhr, Agyal, and Howeitat tribes. In addition, Faisal had a group of Gurkha troops, several British armored car squadrons, the Egyptian Camel Corps, a group of Algerian artillery men commanded by Captain Pisani and air support from the RAF to assist him.

In 1918, the Arab cavalry gained in strength (as it seemed victory was at hand) and they were able to provide Allenby's army with intelligence on Ottoman army positions. They also harassed Ottoman supply columns, attacked small garrisons, and destroyed railway tracks. A major victory occurred on 27 September when an entire brigade of Ottoman, Austrian and German troops, retreating from Mezerib, was virtually wiped out in a battle with Arab forces near the village of Tafas (which the Turks had plundered during their retreat). This led to the so-called Tafas massacre, in which Lawrence claimed in a letter to his brother to have issued a "no-prisoners" order, maintaining after the war that massacre was in retaliation for the earlier Ottoman massacre of the village of Tafas, and that he had at least 250 German and Austrian POWs together with an uncounted number of Turks lined up to be summarily shot. Lawrence later wrote in The Seven Pillars of Wisdom that "In a madness born of the horror of Tafas we killed and killed, even blowing in the heads of the fallen and of the animals; as though their death and running blood could slake our agony". In part due to these attacks, Allenby's last offensive, the Battle of Megiddo, was a stunning success. By late September and October 1918, an increasingly demoralized Ottoman Army began to retreat and surrender whenever possible to British troops. "Sherifial irregulars" accompanied by Lieutenant Colonel T. E. Lawrence captured Deraa on 27 September 1918. The Ottoman army was routed in less than 10 days of battle. Allenby praised Faisal for his role in the victory: "I send your Highness my greetings and my most cordial congratulations upon the great achievement of your gallant troops ... Thanks to our combined efforts, the Ottoman army is everywhere in full retreat".

The first Arab Revolt forces to reach Damascus were Sharif Naser's Hashemite camel cavalry and the cavalry of the Ruwallah tribe, led by Nuri Sha'lan, on 30 September 1918. The bulk of these troops remained outside of the city with the intention of awaiting the arrival of Sharif Faisal. However, a small contingent from the group was sent within the walls of the city, where they found the Arab Revolt flag already raised by surviving Arab nationalists among the citizenry. Later that day Australian Light Horse troops marched into Damascus. Auda Abu Ta'yi, T. E. Lawrence and Arab troops rode into Damascus the next day, 1 October. At the end of the war, the Egyptian Expeditionary Force had seized Palestine, Transjordan, Lebanon, large parts of the Arabian peninsula and southern Syria. Medina, cut off from the rest of the Ottoman Empire, would not surrender until January 1919.

Aftermath 

The United Kingdom agreed in the McMahon–Hussein Correspondence that it would support Arab independence if they revolted against the Ottomans. Both sides had different interpretations of this agreement.

However, the United Kingdom and France reneged on the original deal and divided up the area under the 1916 Sykes–Picot Agreement in ways that the Arabs felt were unfavourable to them. Further confusing the issue was the Balfour Declaration of 1917, which promised support for a Jewish "national home" in Palestine. For a brief period, the Hejaz region of western Arabia became a self-declared state, without being universally recognised as such, under Hussein's control. Although both Ibn Saud and Hussein both received British aid, it was eventually conquered by Ibn Saud in 1925, as part of his military and sociopolitical campaign for the unification of Saudi Arabia.

The Arab Revolt is seen by historians as the first organized movement of Arab nationalism. It brought together different Arab groups for the first time with the common goal to fight for independence from the Ottoman Empire. Much of the history of Arab independence stemmed from the revolt beginning with the kingdom that had been founded by Hussein.

After the war, the Arab Revolt had implications. Groups of people were put into classes that were based on whether they had fought in the revolt and their rank. In Iraq, a group of Sharifian officers from the Arab Revolt formed a political party that they headed. The Hashemites in Jordan remain influenced by the actions of the revolt's Arab leaders.

Underlying causes

Hussein 
According to Efraim Karsh of Bar-Ilan University, Sharif Hussein of Mecca was "a man with grandiose ambitions" who had first started to fall out with his masters in Istanbul when the dictatorship, a triumvirate known as the Three Pashas (General Enver Pasha, Talaat Pasha, and Cemal Pasha), which represented the radical Turkish nationalist wing of the CUP, seized power in a coup d'état in January 1913 and began to pursue a policy of Turkification, which gradually angered non-Turkish subjects. Hussein started to embrace the language of Arab nationalism only after the Young Turks revolt against the Ottoman sultan Abdul Hamid II in July 1908. The fighting force of the revolt was mostly combined from Ottoman defectors and Arabian tribes loyal to the Sharif.

Religious justification 
Though the Sharifian revolt has tended to be regarded as a revolt rooted in a secular Arab nationalist sentiment, the Sharif did not present it in those terms. Rather, he accused the Young Turks of violating the sacred tenets of Islam by pursuing the policy of Turkification and discriminating against its non-Turkish population and called Arab Muslims to sacred rebellion against the Ottoman government. The Turks answered by accusing the rebelling tribes of betraying the Muslim Caliphate during a campaign against imperialist powers attempting to divide and govern Muslim lands. The Turks said the revolting Arabs gained nothing after the revolt; rather, the Middle East was carved up by the British and French.

Ethnic tensions 

While the revolt failed to garner significant support from within the Ottoman Empire's soon-to-be Iraq provinces, it did find huge support from Arab populated Levantine provinces. This early Arab nationalism came about when the majority of the Arabs living in the Ottoman Empire were loyal primarily to their own families, clans, and tribes despite efforts of the Turkish ruling class, who pursued a policy of Turkification through the Tanzimat reforms and hoped to create a feeling of "Ottomanism" among the different ethnicities under the Ottoman domain. Liberal reforms brought about by the Tanzimat also transformed the Ottoman Caliphate into a secular empire, which weakened the Islamic concept of ummah that tied the different races together. The arrival of Committee of Union and Progress to power and the creation of a one-party state in 1913 which mandated Turkish nationalism as a state ideology worsened the relationship between the Ottoman state and its non-Turkish subjects.

See also 
 Campaigns of the Arab Revolt
 Flag of the Arab Revolt
 History of Saudi Arabia
 South Arabia during World War I

Notes

Footnotes

References

Bibliography 
Cleveland, William L. and Martin Bunton. (2016) A History of the Modern Middle East. 6th ed. Westview Press.
Falls, Cyril (1930) Official History of the Great War Based on Official Documents by Direction of the Historical Section of the Committee of Imperial Defence; Military Operations Egypt & Palestine from June 1917 to the End of the War Vol. 2. London: H. M. Stationary
Erickson, Edward. Ordered to Die: A History of the Ottoman Army in the First World War. Westport, CT: Greenwood. .
 
Murphy, David (2008) The Arab Revolt 1916–18 Lawrence sets Arabia Ablaze. Osprey: London. .
Parnell, Charles L. (August 1979) CDR USN "Lawrence of Arabia's Debt to Seapower" United States Naval Institute Proceedings.

Further reading 
 Anderson, Scott (2014). Lawrence in Arabia: War, Deceit, Imperial Folly and the Making of the Modern Middle East. Atlantic Books.
 Fromkin, David (1989). A Peace to End All Peace. Avon Books.
 Korda, Michael, Hero: The Life and Legend of Lawrence of Arabia. .
 Lawrence, T. E. (1935). Seven Pillars of Wisdom. Doubleday, Doran, and Co.
 Oschenwald, William. 'Ironic Origins: Arab Nationalism in the Hijaz, 1882–1914' in The Origins of Arab Nationalism (1991), ed. Rashid Khalidi, pp. 189–203. Columbia University Press.
 Wilson, Mary C. 'The Hashemites, the Arab Revolt, and Arab Nationalism' in The Origins of Arab Nationalism (1991), ed. Rashid Khalidi, pp. 204–24. Columbia University Press.
 "Arab Uprising: Did the Arab Uprising of 1916 Contribute Significantly to the Military and Political Developments in the Middle East?" in Dennis Showalter, ed. History in Dispute: World War I Vol 8 (Gale, 2003) online

External links 
History of the Arab Revolt (on King Hussein's website)
Arab Revolt at PBS
T.E. Lawrence's Original Letters on Palestine Shapell Manuscript Foundation
The Revolt in Arabia by Christiaan Snouck Hurgronje
 Chariots of war: When T.E. Lawrence and his armored Rolls-Royces ruled the Arabian desert, Brendan McAleer, 10 August 2017, Autoweek.

 
1916 in the Ottoman Empire
1917 in the Ottoman Empire
1918 in the Ottoman Empire
20th century in Saudi Arabia
Arab history
Arab nationalism in the Ottoman Empire
Campaigns and theatres of World War I
Conflicts in 1916
Conflicts in 1917
Conflicts in 1918
Guerrilla wars
1916 in religion
20th century in Jordan
20th century in Lebanon
Ottoman Palestine
History of Hejaz
1910s in Ottoman Syria
History of the Arabian Peninsula
Middle Eastern theatre of World War I
Rebellions against the Ottoman Empire
Rebellions in Ottoman Syria
20th-century Islam
1917 in religion
1918 in religion
1910s in Islam